Pierre-Louis Padang Coffin (born 16 March 1967) is a French animator, voice actor, director, producer and writer best known for co-directing four films in the Despicable Me franchise and being the voice of the Minions, which won him the Kids Family Award at the 10th Seiyu Awards.

Life and career
Coffin was born on 16 March 1967 in France to Nh. Dini, an Indonesian novelist and Yves Coffin, a French diplomat. He has a sister, Marie-Claire. During his childhood, they often moved across Asia, living in Cambodia and Japan, before settling in a Parisian suburb in the 1970s. Growing up, their father forbade them watching television, considering it too passive. Instead, Coffin drew, read and listened to music a lot. Although he had never considered a career in the arts, some talented friends of his, who were better at drawing than he, inspired him to work on improving his skills. 

Between 1985 and 1988, he studied cinema at the Paris-Sorbonne University. While attending his military service, he withdrew to take the entrance exam for the Gobelins animation school in Paris. Passing, he studied there the 2D course from 1990 to 1993. Then he moved to Amblin, the 2D London-based facility, where he worked for one year as a junior animator on the Steven Spielberg-executive-produced We're Back! A Dinosaur's Story. He then started as a freelance animator in the French CGI studio Ex Machina where he worked as an animator and eventually animation supervisor. Pierre Coffin's directorial career began with a short film named Pings in 1997. He then started to collaborate by doing commercials with Passion Pictures Paris and Mac Guff. He created the characters Pat & Stan for the titular TF1 TV series. In 2010 he completed, with Chris Renaud, the feature CGI animated movie Despicable Me for Universal.

Coffin directed Despicable Me and Despicable Me 2, with Renaud, Despicable Me 3 and the Despicable Me spin-off, Minions with Kyle Balda. In which he also served as the voice of various Minions. Coffin recorded several different dubs of the Minion voices for Minions in order to better appeal to different national markets, mixing in varying local words depending on the country.

Personal life
Coffin has two children.

Filmography

Film

Television

References

External links

1967 births
Living people
French film directors
French male voice actors
French animators
French animated film directors
French people of Bugis descent
French people of Indonesian descent
Indo people
Bugis people
Javanese people
Illumination (company) people